is a Japanese former professional tennis player.

On 25 October 2010, she reached a career-high singles ranking of 562. She achieved her best doubles ranking of No. 108 on 10 October 2016.

Takahata made her WTA Tour main-draw debut at the 2011 HP Open, where she received a wildcard for the doubles tournament with Shuko Aoyama. Aoyama and Takahata lost to the fourth seeds Kimiko Date-Krumm and Zhang Shuai in a tight three-setter.

At the 2014 Japan Open, she also received a wildcard into the doubles main-draw with Kyōka Okamura. They defeated Misaki Doi and Elina Svitolina in the first round, but lost to Darija Jurak and Megan Moulton-Levy in the quarterfinals.

At the 2015 Taipei Challenger, she won the doubles title, along with Kanae Hisami. In the final, they defeated Marina Melnikova and Elise Mertens, in straight sets.

WTA 125 tournament finals

Doubles: 2 (2 titles)

ITF Circuit finals

Singles: 1 (1 title)

Doubles: 36 (25 titles, 11 runner-ups)

External links
 
 

1989 births
Living people
Japanese female tennis players
Universiade medalists in tennis
People from Hamamatsu
Universiade gold medalists for Japan
Universiade silver medalists for Japan
Medalists at the 2011 Summer Universiade